The Pyramid is a 1992 novel written by Ismail Kadare. It is considered to serve both literary and dissident purposes. It is a political allegory of absolute political power.

Background
The first part of the novel was written in 1988-1990 but was rejected by the state publisher. It was serialized in January 1991 in several issues of the new opposition newspaper Democratic Renaissance.
 After the establishment of pluralism and democracy in Albania, it was completed and published in Tirana and Paris.

Plot
The Pyramid is a political allegory set in ancient Egypt. It is the tale of the conception and construction of the Cheops pyramid but also of absolute political power.

Reception
The New York Times picked up on the significance of The Pyramid:

"For the pyramid, viewed by his subjects as an abiding symbol of his total and incontestable power, comes to be seen by him as a personal memento mori, a constant and paralyzing reminder that his brief life will give way to an eternal entombment in stone."

In 1993, the novel was awarded the Prix Méditerranée Étranger in France.

See also
Albanian literature
Communist Albania
Ismail Kadare

References

1992 novels
20th-century Albanian novels
Novels by Ismail Kadare
Novels set in Albania
Novels set in ancient Egypt
Arcade Publishing books